Mae Phrik is a district (amphoe) in the southern part of Lampang province, northern Thailand.

Geography
Neighboring districts are (from the northeast clockwise): Thoen of Lampang Province, Sam Ngao of Tak province and Li of Lamphun province.

History
Mae Phrik was created in 1904 as a minor district (king amphoe) in Thoen District. It was upgraded to a full district in 1958.

Administration
The district is divided into four subdistricts (tambons), which are further subdivided into 29 villages (mubans). There are two subdistrict municipalities (thesaban tambons): Mae Phrik covers parts of tambons Mae Phrik and tambon Mae Pu. There are a further two tambon administrative organizations (TAO).

Economy
Tambon Pha Pang's population declined from 1,700 persons in 2004 to roughly 900 persons, half of them elderly, in 2019. To combat economic deterioration, the Foundation for Phapang Community Development was founded in 2014. It has undertaken a number of revitalization projects in the area.

References

External links
amphoe.com (Thai)

Mae Phrik